Compsa is a genus of beetles in the family Cerambycidae, containing the following species:

 Compsa albomaculata Martins, 1962
 Compsa albopicta Perty, 1832
 Compsa amoena Fisher, 1937
 Compsa curtula Martins & Napp, 1986
 Compsa diringshofeni (Martins, 1960)
 Compsa inconstans Gounelle, 1909
 Compsa leucozona (Bates, 1885)
 Compsa macra (Thomson, 1867)
 Compsa monrosi (Prosen, 1961)
 Compsa montana Martins, 1971
 Compsa multiguttata Melzer, 1935
 Compsa nebulosa Martins, 1970
 Compsa nipha Martins & Napp, 1986
 Compsa quadriguttata (White, 1855)

References

Ibidionini